BTC City is a shopping mall, sports, entertainment and business area in Ljubljana, Slovenia, with more than 500 shops. It is one of the largest shopping and entertainment complexes in Europe.

History
In 1954, a company named Centralna skladišča (Central Warehouses) was founded with a founding contract. Central Warehouses expanded their operations by starting to carry out the warehousing activities also for other companies, which were not among the co-founders of the company. Due to the expansion of the activity and the extent of operations, the company changed its name to Javna skladišča (Public Warehouses).  In 1975, the company became the largest goods and transport centre in former Yugoslavia. In the same year, Javna skladišča changed its name to Blagovno Transportni Center Ljubljana (Ljubljana Goods and Transport Centre, BTC). 1990 presents a turning point for BTC. In search and confirmation of the entrepreneurial freedom, the company decided to change its name to Blagovno Trgovinski Center (Goods and Shopping Centre) and the company, which, up to that point, managed warehousing space, transformed itself to a public limited company in 1990, becoming responsible for the selection of new, profitable, compatible and competitive programmes and business contents, and suitable infrastructure as well. First individual stores started opening. In 1993, when the management of the company was taken over by Jože Mermal, the empty warehousing facilities began to acquire a new, more attractive image, and the first shops formed in the renovated Hall A. In 1994, the company stocks were quoted on the Ljubljana Stock Exchange. In 1997, the public limited company BTC became an international capital company, as its shares were the listed at the London Stock Exchange as shares of the first Slovenian company. Soon afterwards, the Frankfurt and Munich Stock Exchanges followed.

Facilities
BTC City has a total gross area of more than 250,000 m2. It includes a main shopping mall called CityPark, 16 smaller shopping malls, a multiplex with twelve screens, the recently opened Radisson Blu Plaza Hotel Ljubljana, a market, a mini golf course, a waterpark with a spa center and an entertainment center with a casino, bowling, 3D cinema as well as two high rise office buildings. One of these, the Crystal Palace, is the tallest building in Slovenia.

CityPark 
It is the main shopping mall with more than 150 shops and 15 bars and restaurants (including the only Burger King in Slovenia). It was built in three phases from 2002 to 2010. Major anchors include: Adidas, H&M,  Interspar, K&0, Marks&Spencer, NewYorker.

Restaurants

Bangkok Street
Burger King 
Chinese House
Imperio Mexicano 
InterSpar Restaurant
McDonald's
Pizzeria Al Capone
Restaurant Pri Oljki

Electronics, telecommunications

Apple store
Big Bang
Comshop
Sony Centre
Telekom Slovenija

Cosmetics

DM Drogerie Markt
L'Occitane en Provence
Limoni
Melvita
Stenders

Fashion and sport

7Camicie
Accessorize
Adidas
Blue Jeans Shop
Calzedonia
Comma
Desigual
Exclusive
Fred Perry
G-Star Raw
Guess
H&M
Hervis Sport
Intimissimi
Jack and Jones
Jack Wolfskin
Kastner & Öhler Fashion House (Armani Jeans, Calvin Klein, Diesel, Lacoste, etc.)
Levi's   
Lisca
Marks & Spencer 
Mura   
Naracamicie
NewYorker
Okaidi
Orsay
Palmers
Princess
Promod
S.Oliver
Socks
Sportina
Tally Weijl
Tkanina
Tom Tailor
Tomas Sport
Triumph
Two Way
Women's Secret
XYZ Premium Fashion Store
Zero

Fashion accessories, jewellery and watches

Kleo Bijoux
Six
Sten Time
Swarovski
Swatch
Jewlerry Celje, Jewlerry Sterle

Shoes and bags

After Leonardo
Bags & More
Bata Shoes
Camper
Deichmann
Humanic
Mass
Toko
Transport Footwear

Kolosej 
It is a multiplex that was open in 2001. It has got twelve screens with capacity of viewers from 140 to 600. Inside of the multiplex there is also an entertainment section with billiards and other games, two restaurants and McDonald's, three bars, a bookshop and two fashion shops.

References

External links 
 

Buildings and structures in Ljubljana
Jarše District
Shopping malls in Slovenia